The Queiq (Modern Standard Arabic: , Quwayq, ; northern Syrian Arabic: ʾWēʾ), with many variant spellings,  known in antiquity as the Belus (Bēlos), Chalos and also known in English as the Aleppo River is an endorheic river and valley of the Aleppo Governorate, Syria and Turkey. It is a -long river that flows through the northern Syrian city of Aleppo. It arises from the southern Aintab plateau in southeastern Turkey. The Akpınar River in the Kilis plain is one of the headwaters of the Queiq. The former town of Qinnasrin lay on its banks. It partly flows along the western rim of the Matah Depression. The valley has been occupied for thousands of years and in ancient times the Queiq valley was noted for its flint industries and pottery.

The river dried up completely in the late 1960s, due to irrigation projects on the Turkish side of the border. Recently, water from the Euphrates has been diverted to revive the dead river, and thus revive agriculture in the plains south of Aleppo, but many Syrians remain bitter towards the Turks over their handling of the river. To revive the river and build irrigation, the Tal Hasel Water Pumping Station was opened in 2008 in rural Aleppo. The station was restored after its damage in 2012 and put into operation again in July 2022.

Queiq River Massacre 
In late January 2013 during the Syrian civil war over 100 dead bodies were shored up from or floating in the river in rebel-held parts of Bustan al-Qasr district, Aleppo. They were typically found with hands tied behind their backs and having gunshot wounds on ther their heads with the tape across mouth. Nearly all the victims were in their twenties (not older than 30) who had recently crossed the border line from rebel-controlled neighbourhood into the government one. The blame for murders was widely put on Bashar al-Assad's regime as the bodies usually came downstream from the government controlled area.

Between February and mid-March 2013, between 80 and 120 additional bodies were recovered from the river.

Youssef Horan, a lawyer and activist, with his team of volunteers have gathered information on the murders at the time. The Syrian Institute for Justice headed at the time by Abdulkader Mandou, also investigated the case and held a press conference.

Gallery

References

Aleppo
Aleppo Governorate
Rivers of Syria
Rivers of Turkey
International rivers of Asia
Landforms of Adıyaman Province
Massacres of men
Violence against men in Asia